Cladonia sipmanii is a species of fruticose lichen in the family Cladoniaceae. Found in Guyana, it was formally described as a new species in 2000 by Finnish lichenologist Teuvo Ahti. The type specimen was collected by the author from Demerara-Mahaica region; it also occurs in the Guayana Region of Venezuela. It grows in sandy soil and on sandstone; typical habitat includes coastal savannahs. Thamnolic acid, barbatic acid, and 4-O-demethylbarbatic acid are lichen products that have been isolated from this species.

See also
List of Cladonia species

References

sipmanii
Lichen species
Lichens described in 2000
Lichens of Guyana
Lichens of Venezuela
Taxa named by Teuvo Ahti